HMS Arlingham was one of 93 ships of the  of inshore minesweepers.

The names of these ships were all chosen from villages ending in -ham. This minesweeper was named after Arlingham in Gloucestershire.

In 1969, HMS Arlingham was rammed by a Spanish Customs launch near Gibraltar, which was later the subject of a formal complaint.

Further reading

References

 

Ham-class minesweepers
Royal Navy ship names
1953 ships